Maryland Route 131 (MD 131) is a state highway located in Baltimore County in the U.S. state of Maryland. Known as Seminary Avenue, the state highway runs  from MD 25 in Brooklandville east to MD 45 in Lutherville. MD 131 was mostly constructed by 1910, with the remainder completed in the early 1920s.

Route description

MD 131 begins at a four-way intersection with MD 25 (Falls Road) in Brooklandville. The west leg of the intersection is the entrance to St. Paul's School. MD 131 heads east as a two-lane undivided road through the southern end of the suburban community of Mays Chapel. The state highway passes over Interstate 83 (I-83, Harrisburg Expressway) with no access and enters Lutherville, where the road crosses MTA Maryland's Baltimore Light RailLink at-grade. MD 131 continues through the Lutherville Historic District and intersects Bellona Road before reaching its eastern terminus at MD 45 (York Road). Seminary Avenue continues east as a county highway that intersects MD 146 (Dulaney Valley Road) and passes through Hampton before ending at Providence Road.

History
Seminary Avenue was paved from Brooklandville east to the rail crossing—then part of the Northern Central Railway—by 1910. The remainder of the highway was paved by 1923. The bridge that carries Seminary Avenue over I-83 has a bronze dedication plaque for the highway construction project. Aside from that construction around 1954, there has been very little change to MD 131 since then.

Junction list

See also

References

External links

MDRoads: MD 131
MD 131 at AARoads.com

131
Roads in Baltimore County, Maryland